Chrystalleni Trikomiti (born 30 November 1993) is a Rhythmic Gymnast from Cyprus.

Career 
Trikomiti At the 2010 Commonwealth Games in Delhi, India, she burst on to the scene when she won two gold medals, one silver medal, and two bronze medals.

Notably, her final and second gold medal winning performance of the event had a difficulty rating of 8.85, an artistic skills rating of 8.5, and an execution rating of 8.5, earning her a total score of 25.8 and a standing ovation from the crowd. Chrystalleni narrowly missed the Gold in the all round performance when she dropped the ball. At this moment she was tied with Naazmi Johnston (AUS) with 75.425 points but  the drop cost her the Gold and she finished with the Silver.

On 14 October, at the 2010 Commonwealth Games' closing ceremony, Chrystalleni was honored with the responsibility of carrying the Cyprus flag in front of 60,000 attending spectators. She finished 19th in qualifications at the 2012 Summer Olympics.

Medals at Commonwealth Games 2010

References

External links
Athlete Profile
Medal Tally for Cyprus in 2010 Commonwealth Games

Living people
People from Larnaca
Cypriot rhythmic gymnasts
Gymnasts at the 2012 Summer Olympics
Olympic gymnasts of Cyprus
1993 births
Cypriot sportswomen
Gymnasts at the 2010 Commonwealth Games
Commonwealth Games gold medallists for Cyprus
Commonwealth Games silver medallists for Cyprus
Commonwealth Games bronze medallists for Cyprus
Commonwealth Games medallists in gymnastics
Medallists at the 2010 Commonwealth Games